Bryoplaca is a genus of lichenized fungi belonging to the family Teloschistaceae.

Species:
Bryoplaca jungermanniae
Bryoplaca sinapisperma
Bryoplaca tetraspora

References

Teloschistales
Lichen genera
Teloschistales genera
Taxa described in 2013